Iso-Polifonia  is a newspaper published in Albania. The newspaper specializes on articles regarding Albanian polyphonic music.

References

Monthly newspapers
Albanian-language newspapers
Newspapers published in Albania
Mass media in Gjirokastër